Sondra Marshak (née Hassan; born June 15, 1942) is an American science-fiction writer. She is most well known for her work co-written with Myrna Culbreath. She was a co-writer of Star Trek Lives! (1975), with Jacqueline Lichtenberg, and television producer Joan Winston. She was an early promoter of Star Trek fan culture, and a publisher of fan fiction.

Early life 
Marshak was born to Albert Hassan and Anna Tornheim in 1942. Little is known of her early life. In an interview for Voyages of Imagination (2006) by Jeff Ayers, Myrna Culbreath explained that Marshak had earned a master's degree in history, with "straight-A honors," prior to their meeting, and that Marshak had planned to enter a doctoral program. She married LSU professor Alan Marshak, and had one son.

Fannish activity 
Following her introduction to Star Trek, Marshak began writing fiction based on the series, and submitted it to fanzines which led to her meeting Jacqueline Lichtenberg. Upon being introduced to Star Trek, she was struck by the "powerful relationship between Kirk and Spock and the focus on moral and philosophical issues." Marshak's first fan-published work was a re-write of Spock's Decision, originally written by Lichtenberg in 1971. The rewrite was anthologized in the fanzines Berengaria #2 (January 1974) and Kraith Collected #4 (June 1974). Her other writings were set in the Kraith universe which was loosely based on Star Trek.

During the mid-to-late 70's, Marshak and her writing partner Myrna Culbreath were regular guests of honor at science fiction conventions. She was often joined on-stage by her mother, whom she addressed as "Mama-Anna".

Marshak is an avowed Objectivist (a devotee of Ayn Rand), and she believes Star Trek advances objectivist ideals.

Career 
Marshak's first professional publication was the reference work Star Trek Lives! (1975), co-written with Lichtenberg and Joan Winston. The ninth chapter, "Do-It-Yourself Star Trek," discussed structure and themes in fan fiction and how they may reflect the cultural and sexual ideas of the fans who write them. The book, and in particular the book's final chapter, inspired Francesca Coppa to call Marshak and her fellow authors "the foremothers of 'fanfiction scholarship'" in The Fanfiction Reader (2017).

Marshak co-wrote six Star Trek tie-in books with her writing partner, Myrna Culbreath, in addition to the William Shatner biography Shatner: Where No Man… (December 1979).  In Voyages of Imagination, both Culbreath and Marshak described their writing partnership as "virtually a Vulcan mind-meld." She also contributed trivia to The Star Trek Puzzle Manual (1976) by Jeff Razzi.

In the author's notes for The Fate of the Phoenix (1979), several projects were listed as forthcoming. In addition to follow-ups to The New Voyages series, Marshak and Culbreath announced a fictional travel guide, Mr. Spock's Guide to the Planet Vulcan, a new novel co-written by Nichelle Nichols, Uhura!, and a non-Star Trek science fantasy novel co-written by William Shatner, The Power. None of the books were realized, nor published if completed.

Marshak has not published any new fiction since 1983, nor has she given any interviews since 2006. She was interviewed by the Orange County Business Journal in 2000 where she promoted Culbreath's PhonicsOpoly (1999) reading game. In 2012, Jacqueline Lichtenberg wrote a comment to a blog written by literary critic Steve Donoghue concerning Marshak's lack of an online presence.

Bibliography

Non-fiction 
 Star Trek Lives! (July 1975), with Jacqueline Lichtenberg and Joan Winston. Bantam Books #Y2151.
 The Star Trek Puzzle Manual (November 1976), with Jeff Razzi and Myrna Culbreath. Bantam Books .
 Shatner: Where No Man…: The Authorized Biography of William Shatner (December 1979), with William Shatner and Myrna Culbreath. Ace .

Editor 
 Star Trek: The New Voyages (March 1976), with Myrna Culbreath. Bantam Books #X2719.
 Star Trek: The New Voyages 2 (January 1978), with Myrna Culbreath. Bantam Books .

Fiction 
 The Price of the Phoenix (July 1977), with Myrna Culbreath. Bantam Books .
 The Fate of the Phoenix (May 1979), with Myrna Culbreath. Bantam Books .
 The Prometheus Design (March 1982), with Myrna Culbreath. Pocket Books .
 Triangle (March 1983), with Myrna Culbreath. Pocket Books .

Short fiction 
 "Surprise!" Star Trek: The New Voyages 2 (January 1978) with Nichelle Nichols and Myrna Culbreath.
 "The Procrustean Petard," Star Trek: The New Voyages 2 (January 1978) with Myrna Culbreath.

References

External links 
 
 Authors: Sondra Marshak at The Encyclopedia of Science Fiction.
 Sondra Marshak at Goodreads.

American science fiction writers
Star Trek fiction writers
Star Trek fanfiction writers
1942 births
Living people
Objectivists
Women science fiction and fantasy writers